François Willème (27 May 1830 – 31 January 1905) was a French artist (painter, sculptor and photographer).

Willème developed and patented a process for producing portrait sculpture using synchronized photo projections to create photosculptures.

References

External links
 

1830 births
1905 deaths
French artists